This is a list of Bien de Interés Cultural landmarks in the Province of Málaga, Spain.

Acinipo
Alcazaba of Antequera
Cueva de Menga
Alcazaba of Málaga
Buenavista Palace (Málaga)
Caves of Nerja
Cueva de la Pileta
Dolmen de Viera
Fundación Picasso
Hospital Bazán
Málaga Cathedral
Museo de Málaga 
Plaza de Toros de Ronda
Sohail Castle
Torre Ladrones
Villa romana de Río Verde

References 

Malaga